The 42nd Félix Awards were held on November 7, 2021 to honour achievements in Quebec music. The gala ceremony was hosted by Louis-José Houde, and televised by Ici Radio-Canada Télé.

Nominees and winners

References

Felix
Felix
Felix
Félix Awards